Bolazine, also known as 2α-methyl-5α-androstan-17β-ol-3-one azine, is a synthetic androgen/anabolic steroid (AAS) of the dihydrotestosterone (DHT) group which was never marketed. It is not orally active and is used as the ester prodrug bolazine capronate (brand name Roxilon Inject) via depot intramuscular injection. Bolazine has a unique and unusual chemical structure, being a dimer of drostanolone linked at the C3 position of the A-ring by an azine group, and reportedly acts as a prodrug of drostanolone.

See also 
 List of androgens/anabolic steroids

References 

Androgens and anabolic steroids
Androstanes
Dimers (chemistry)
Organonitrogen compounds
Prodrugs